Paulo Gustavo Amaral Monteiro de Barros (30 October 1978 – 4 May 2021), commonly known as Paulo Gustavo, was a Brazilian actor, comedian, director, screenwriter, and presenter.

He became known for the play Minha Mãe é uma Peça, which, in 2013, became a feature film. It became the most watched film of the year in Brazil, and in 2015, it was published as a book by the publisher Objetiva. Due to the huge success of critics and audiences, it was followed by two sequels, Minha Mãe é uma Peça 2 in 2016, and Minha Mãe é uma Peça 3 in 2019.

Nominated for the Shell Award for Best Actor, Paulo Gustavo graduated from the Casa das Artes de Laranjeiras (CAL) in early 2005, together with Fábio Porchat, Marcus Majella, among others.

Career
Gustavo gained visibility at the end of 2004, when he joined the cast of the play Surto. On occasion, he introduced the humorous character Dona Hermínia. After his graduation in January 2005, he left the cast of Surto and joined the play Infraturas. During this period he also began to make small appearances on TV, such as in the telenovela Prova de Amor, by RecordTV, and in the series A Diarista, by Globo. In 2006, the play Minha Mãe É Uma Peça premiered; it was adaptated for cinema in 2013 and gained a sequel in 2016. In the monologue, with a text of his own, Gustavo again played Dona Hermínia. Built through her domestic and experiential observations, it brings together the most comical aspects of the personality of a typical middle-aged housewife, always on the verge of a nervous breakdown. His performance earned him a Prêmio Shell nomination for best actor.

Gustavo starred in a title again on stage in 2010, to present the show Hiperativo, directed by Fernando Caruso. In 2011, he became the host of 220 Volts. In June 2013, the sitcom Vai Que Cola debuted in TV production at Multishow, which spawned a film adaptation in 2015. In 2014, the actor was on a new program, the reality Paulo Gustavo na Estrada, by Multishow.

In 2017, he left Vai Que Cola and joined the program A Vila, along with Katiuscia Canoro, with the script by Leandro Soares. In 2018, he recorded the DVD of the play Minha Mãe é uma Peça at Concha Acustica at Teatro Castro Alves in the city of Salvador.

Personal life
Born and raised in a middle-class family in the city of Niterói, in Greater Rio de Janeiro, Gustavo studied at the traditional Colégio Salesiano during elementary school. Openly homosexual since adolescence, on 20 December 2015, he married dermatologist Thales Bretas. On 13 October 2017, Gustavo announced on his Instagram that he and his husband would be the parents of twins, whom they planned to name Gael and Flora, conceived through surrogacy, but the babies died in a miscarriage. They thought about giving up on becoming parents, but decided to look for another surrogate. On 18 August 2019, in a post on his Instagram, he announced the birth of the couple's children, called Romeu and Gael, from different surrogates.

Illness and death
On 13 March 2021, Gustavo was admitted with a diagnosis of COVID-19. On 2 April, his illness worsened and he was introduced to extracorporeal membrane oxygenation. On 3 May, even after improving in the previous days, Gustavo suffered a pulmonary embolism, which caused a significant worsening of his health. The medical report released that day said his condition was "unstable and extremely serious." On the afternoon of the following day, 4 May, a medical report stated that Gustavo's condition was irreversible, but he still had vital signs. He later died that same night, at 9:12 pm (local time), at the age of 42.

Filmography

Television

Cinema

Music videos

Web

Awards and nominations

References

External links
 

1978 births
2021 deaths
People from Niterói
20th-century Brazilian male actors
21st-century Brazilian male actors
20th-century comedians
21st-century comedians
20th-century screenwriters
21st-century screenwriters
Brazilian male comedians
Brazilian male film actors
Brazilian male stage actors
Brazilian male television actors
Brazilian male screenwriters
Brazilian gay writers
Deaths from the COVID-19 pandemic in Rio de Janeiro (state)
Brazilian gay actors
Gay screenwriters
Gay comedians
Brazilian LGBT comedians
Brazilian LGBT screenwriters